Streptomyces zagrosensis is a bacterium species from the genus of Streptomyces which has been isolated from rhizospheric soil in the Fars Province in Iran.

See also 
 List of Streptomyces species

References

Further reading

External links
Type strain of Streptomyces zagrosensis at BacDive – the Bacterial Diversity Metadatabase

zagrosensis
Bacteria described in 2014